Business Mir is a bilingual (English/Russian) magazine based in Switzerland.  It focuses on topics covering the political, economic and social links between Russia, Switzerland and Europe. The magazine has been published in Geneva since 2006 and is distributed in numerous European countries (Switzerland, Great Britain, France, Germany, Austria, the Czech Republic, etc.) as well as in the United States, Canada and Israel.

Business Mir targets an audience of Swiss, Russian and European investors, financial players, travellers and businessmen. Business Mir publishes in-depth articles on the economic developments and business opportunities in Russia as well as Russia's ties to Western industries, new markets and high-stakes energy issues. Business Mir also features lifestyle articles providing selections of the finest hotels, restaurants, spas, private clinics, banks, etc.

Business Mir also publishes an online news platform providing high added-value economic, political and cultural information which is updated daily.

See also
 List of magazines in Switzerland

References

External links
 Official site (in English and in Russian)
 Blog (in Russian)

2006 establishments in Switzerland
Bilingual magazines
Business magazines
English-language magazines
Magazines established in 2006
Magazines published in Geneva
Quarterly magazines published in Switzerland
Russian-language magazines